The Lihiniya MK 1 is an unmanned aerial vehicle under development by the Sri Lanka Air Force (SLAF) and the Centre for Research and Development (CRD) as an experimental platform to test technologies for its indigenous UAV program. 

During the civil war the SLAF used UAVs for reconnaissance operations. They used drones from US and Israel such as the IAI Searcher, E.M.I.T Blue Horizon 2 and the RQ-2 Pioneer. In 2010 the Sri Lanka Air Force started to build the prototypes of a new locally made UAV under the supervision of the Air Chief Marshal.

Design
The aircraft is a HTOL UAV with a high wing, twin-boom tail and a single pusher engine. The Unmanned Aircraft Systems (UAS) developed by the CRD consists of the UAV aircraft, two ground control stations (GCS) and a mobile Advanced Ground Control Station (AGCS). The data from this UAS program is being used for the development of the Lihiniya MK II which will have a range of 100km.

Deployments
Lihiniya MK1 deployed to No. 111 Squadron SLAF in SLAF Base Vauniya. In 2022 Remote triggering mechanism for aerial firing introduced to Lihiniya UAVs.

Specifications

See also 
 No. 111 Squadron SLAF

References 

Post–Cold War military equipment of Sri Lanka
Single-engined pusher aircraft